The Cape Catfish are a franchise of the Prospect League that plays in Cape Girardeau, Missouri.

The Catfish play in the Prospect League's Western conference in the Prairie Land division, along with the Alton River Dragons, O'Fallon Hoots,  and Springfield Lucky Horseshoes.

Ownership
The team is owned by a partnership group that includes Anand "Andy" Patel, Mark Hogan, Kishan Patel and James Limbaugh. Hogan, a retired former baseball coach at Southeast Missouri State University, will also serve as the team's General manager.

Name origin
The Catfish name, a reference to the state fish of Missouri, was chosen by potential fans of the new team from a list of names that also included the Cape Bluebirds, in reference to the Eastern bluebird, which is the state bird of Missouri, and the Cape Steamboats, in honor of the Mississippi River city's history as a port on the river. "Catfish" received about 37% of the vote fan vote, beating out "Bluebirds" and "Steamboats", which received 32% and 31% of the vote, respectively.

Stadium
The Catfish play in 2,000 seat Capaha Field. The stadium, also home to Southeast Missouri State University's baseball team, received significant renovations prior to the beginning of the team's first season.

Inaugural season
On October 16, 2018, the team announced that former Texas Rangers and Cincinnati Reds farmhand Steve Larkin will serve as the manager for the 2019 season. The team clinched the league's West Division championship on August 1, tying the league record for wins in a season in the process.

Seasons

Roster

References

Amateur baseball teams in Missouri
Prospect League teams
Baseball teams established in 2018
2018 establishments in Missouri
Cape Girardeau, Missouri